The Bowie State Bulldogs are the athletic teams that represent Bowie State University, located in Bowie, Maryland, in intercollegiate sports at the Division II level of the National Collegiate Athletic Association (NCAA), primarily competing in the Central Intercollegiate Athletic Association since the 1979–80 academic year.

Bowie State competes in thirteen intercollegiate varsity sports. Men's sports include basketball, cross country, football, and track and field (indoor and outdoor); while women's sports include basketball, bowling, cross country, softball, tennis, track and field (indoor and outdoor), and volleyball.

Conference affiliations 
NCAA
 Central Intercollegiate Athletic Association (1979–present)

Varsity teams

Notable alumni

Football 
 Kevin Broadus
 Henry Frazier III
 Delano Johnson
 Khari Lee
 Isaac Redman
 Damon Wilson

Men's basketball 
 Dalonte Hill

References

External links